StudyPlaces is an education Colleges & Universities portal in India.

StudyPlaces.co.in is visited by more than 100,000 students every month, and has more than registered members.

Services
StudyPlaces.co.in provides information linked to education.

Career Counseling 
StudyPlaces’ counselors work to help answer students' questions and guide them in the right direction for their schooling and career paths.

Practice Tests 
StudyPlaces provides students with a number of free practice tests, information, and learning tools to help them prepare for studying in both India and internationally in various fields.

Discussion Forums 
StudyPlaces has a number of fora where users can post questions and share information regarding schools, admission processes, acquiring visas for various countries, and interests regarding engineering, MBA programs, medicine, and law.

College Search 
Studyplaces' college search allows students to find schools catering to their interests, areas of study, and academic standing. In addition, it offers a number of articles, resources, and descriptions of many schools and their offerings.

Articles 
The home page of the website features stories relating to various career paths. Often integrated into the articles are further resources to help guide individuals towards getting involved in their specific career. Additionally, articles can feature institution highlights and social and economic trends in the education world.

References 

Study abroad programs
Social networking websites